István Tóth-Potya (28 July 1891 – 6 February 1945) was a Hungarian amateur footballer.

He was a member of the Hungarian Olympic squad at the 1912 Summer Olympics. He was an unused reserve player for the duration of the games and did not play a match in the 1912 football tournament.

For the Hungary national team he played 19 games and scored 8 goals. He later had a coaching career, with alternating spells managing teams in Hungary and Italy.

Death
Returning from Italy and serving as a reserve officer in the Hungarian army, during World War II he became a member of the Hungarian anti-fascist resistance following Hungary's invasion by Germany, in association with former teammate Geza Kertesz helping several hundred people escape from Nazi custody and death. He and Kertesz were arrested by the German Gestapo in late 1944 and executed in February 1945 in Budapest by Hitler's Hungarian allies, Szálasi's Arrow Cross henchmen.

His body and that of Kertesz were reburied after the war in April 1946 in Kerepesi Cemetery, Budapest.

References 

1891 births
1945 deaths
Footballers from Budapest
Hungarian footballers
Ferencvárosi TC footballers
Hungary international footballers
Olympic footballers of Hungary
Footballers at the 1912 Summer Olympics
Hungarian football managers
Ferencvárosi TC managers
U.S. Triestina Calcio 1918 managers
Inter Milan managers
Újpest FC managers
Association football forwards
Hungarian resistance members
Resistance members killed by Nazi Germany
People executed by the Government of National Unity (Hungary)
Burials at Kerepesi Cemetery